Carson Township is one of twenty townships in Fayette County, Illinois, USA.  As of the 2010 census, its population was 141 and it contained 72 housing units.  This township was formed from Bowling Green Township.

Geography

Extinct towns
 Twin Churches

Cemeteries
The township contains these four cemeteries: Blankenship, Reed, Staff and Welch.

Demographics

School districts
 Cowden-Herrick Community Unit School District 3a
 Ramsey Community Unit School District 204

Political districts
 Illinois's 19th congressional district
 State House District 102
 State Senate District 51

References
 
 United States Census Bureau 2007 TIGER/Line Shapefiles
 United States National Atlas

External links
 City-Data.com
 Illinois State Archives

Townships in Fayette County, Illinois
Townships in Illinois